Pachycarpus is a genus of plants in the family Apocynaceae, first described in 1838. It is native to Africa.

Species

formerly included
moved to other genera (Asclepias, Gomphocarpus, Xysmalobium)

References

Apocynaceae genera
Asclepiadoideae